Semasiology (from , , "signification") is a discipline of linguistics concerned with the question "what does the word X mean?". It studies the meaning of words regardless how they are pronounced. It is the opposite of onomasiology, a branch of lexicology that starts with a concept or object and asks for its name, i.e., "how do you express X?" whereas semasiology starts with a word and asks for its meanings.

The exact meaning of semasiology is somewhat obscure. It is often used as a synonym of semantics (the study of the meaning of words, phrases, and longer forms of expression). However, semasiology is also sometimes considered part of lexical semantics, a narrow subfield of lexicology (the study of words) and semantics.

The term was first used in German by Christian Karl Reisig in 1825 in his work, [Lectures on Latin Linguistics], and was used in English by 1847. Semantics replaced it in its original meaning, beginning in 1893.

See also 
 Onomasiology
 Semasiography
 Semiotics

References 

Lexicology
Semantics